Nature Reviews Nephrology is a monthly peer-reviewed review journal published by Nature Portfolio. It was established as Nature Clinical Practice Nephrology in 2005, but change name in 2009. The editor-in-chief is Susan Allison.

Coverage includes prevention, diagnosis, and treatment of disorders of the kidney in the adult and child, including hypertension, infection/inflammation, dialysis/chronic uremia, renal failure, transplantation, applied physiology, epidemiology, pathology, immunology, cancer, and genetics.

Abstracting and indexing
The journal is abstracted and indexed in:

PubMed/MEDLINE
Science Citation Index Expanded
Scopus

According to the Journal Citation Reports, the journal has a 2021 impact factor of 42.439, ranking it 1st out of 90 journals in the category "Urology & Nephrology".

References

External links
 Official website

Nature Research academic journals
Nephrology journals
Publications established in 2005
Monthly journals
English-language journals
Review journals